Luciano Lamberti (San Francisco, Córdoba, 1978) is an Argentine writer.

He holds a bachelor's degree in modern literature from the National University of Córdoba in Argentina. He writes for local and national media, works as a high school language teacher, and leads the creative-writing workshop of the Provincial Neuropsychiatric Hospital in Córdoba.

Works
Fiction
 Sueños de siesta. La Creciente, 2006.
 El asesino de chanchos. Tamarisco, 2010.
 Los campos magnéticos. Sofía Cartonera, 2012.
 El loro que podía adivinar el futuro. Nudista, 2012.

Poetry
 San Francisco Córdoba. Funesiana, 2008.

Selected anthologies
 Es lo que hay. Lilia Lardone, ed. Babel, 2008.
 10 bajistas. Alejo Carbonell, ed. Eduvim, 2008.
 Ungrito de corazón. Damián Ríos, Mariano Blatt, eds. Mondadori, 2009.
 Autopista. Javier Mattio, Daniel Salzano, eds. Raíz de dos, 2010.
 Hablar de mí. Juan Terranova, ed. Lengua de Trapo.
 No entren al 1408. Jorge Luis Cáceres, Babel, 2013.

References 

1978 births
Argentine male short story writers
Argentine male poets
People from San Francisco, Córdoba
Living people